Giorgi Kveseladze (born November 11, 1997) is a Georgian and Gloucester  rugby union player.

Career 
In 2018, Kveseladze played for Georgia Sevens, participating with Georgia in the 2018 Hong Kong rugby sevens tournament.
He will quickly win in the Georgian back lines, holding the 2018 and 2019 European Championships. He was included in the Georgian squad for the 2019 Rugby World Cup. He played four matches for Georgia, and scored a try against Uruguay.

In 2020, after having taken part in the Rugby Europe International Championships again, he is part of the squad that takes part in the Autumn Nations Cup. It is particularly evident during the meeting against Ireland. He scored the first try for Georgia in the competition, and was named best player of the third weekend of competition. At the end of the competition, his try was voted the best try of the tournament. 

On 16 December 2020, Kveseladze joined English side Gloucester in the Premiership Rugby on an undisclosed length deal. He is only the second Georgian player in history to sign with a Premiership club. He made his first appearance on the 6 February 2021 against London Irish, coming on in the 67th minute. He made his first start for the club against Northampton Saints.

External links
Itsrugby profile

References

1997 births
Living people
Rugby union players from Georgia (country)
Georgia international rugby union players
Rugby union centres